David Morgan (1933 - 1988) was a British composer.

Life and career 
Morgan was born in Harpenden, Hertfordshire in 1933. In 1961 he began his studies at the Royal Academy of Music, with Alan Bush (composition) and Leighton Lucas (orchestration). He was awarded ten prizes for his compositions between 1961 and 1965 including the Eric Coates Prize.

After receiving a British Council Scholarship, David Morgan moved to Prague to study at the Academy of Music under Vaclav Dobias. During this period he wrote his Violin Concerto, which was premiered at the Dvořák Hall in Prague. He returned to England in 1967 after which a number of his lighter works were produced by the BBC Light Music Department.

In 1974 the violinist Erich Gruenberg performed his Violin Concerto with the Royal Philharmonic Orchestra, conducted by Sir Charles Groves at the Royal Festival Hall in London. Morgan's Sinfonia da Requiem was performed there later in the same year.  Two of his major works were recorded by Lyrita in 1976 - the Violin Concerto (with Erich Gruenberg) and Contrasts performed by the RPO conducted by Vernon Handley.

In 1981 Morgan moved to Canada. He worked as a composer for symphonic wind band, and continued to receive commissions from Britain, including his orchestral Variations on a Theme of Walton. 1984 marked the Canadian Premiere of his Partita by the Kingston Symphony Orchestra and 1986 and 1987 saw the world premiere of Interludes and Canzonas for brass quintet and the Canadian premiere of Concerto for Wind Orchestra.

David Morgan died in Belleville, Canada in 1988.

Selected works

Orchestral
 Violin Concerto, 1966
 Sinfonia da Requiem, 1971–72
 Partita, 1972
 Contrasts, 1974
 Black segment, in the collective work "Colours", by Vic Lewis and al. (1977)
 Cello Concerto, 1981
 Variations on a Theme of Walton, 1981–84
 Sonata for chamber orchestra, 1985 
 Clarinet Concerto
 Concerto da Camera; Music for Children 
 Overture for a Festive Occasion
 Serenade for string orchestra; Spring Carnival
 Threnody for string orchestra 
 Concerto for Wind Orchestra

Vocal
 I Loved a Lass, for mixed choir, 1948
 Seven Nursery Rhymes, for voice and piano (1952)
 Three Tudor Lyrics, for mixed choir (1964)
 Four English Folk Songs, for soloists, mixed choir and guitar (1965)

Chamber and instrumental
 Piano Sonata, 1960
 Oboe Quartet, 1962 
 Trio for Seven, 1962
 Divertimento for brass, 1964
 String Quartet, 1964
 Interludes and Canzonas for brass, 1983
 Lyric Suite for guitar, 1987
Fantasy Sonata for Flute, 1974 (written for flautist Susan Milan)

References

External links 
 https://www.worldcat.org/identities/lccn-no2017049344/ Entry David Morgan in WorldCat
 http://www.wyastone.co.uk/violin-concertos-fricker-morgan-banks.htmlRecording by David Morgan 
 http://classicalsource.com/db_control/db_cd_review.php?id=5764Reference to David Morgan on Classical Source
https://www.gramophone.co.uk/review/banks-fricker-morgan-violin-concertos Review of David Morgan's Concerto for Violin on Grammophone Newsletter

1933 births
1988 deaths
People from Harpenden
20th-century British composers
Alumni of the Royal Academy of Music
British emigrants to Canada